Chutney Popcorn is a 1999 comedy-drama film starring, directed and co-written by Nisha Ganatra. Ganatra plays a young lesbian Indian American woman called Reena. Jill Hennessy plays her girlfriend Lisa and Reena's mother and sister are played by real life mother and daughter Madhur Jaffrey and Sakina Jaffrey. The film explores the conflict between Reena's sexual and national identities as well as her mother Meenu's attempts to come to terms with the Western lives of both her daughters.

Plot 
Reena is a young Indian American lesbian who lives and works in New York City. Her sister Sarita, who is happily married, discovers that she is infertile. Reena offers to be a surrogate mother for her sister's baby, hoping to improve her relationship with their mother, who disapproves of Reena's sexual orientation. Sarita and her husband accept Reena's offer but Sarita begins to have second thoughts. After Reena becomes pregnant, her relationship with her girlfriend Lisa suffers. When the baby is born, Reena and Lisa are reunited, as are Reena's family.

Cast 
 Nisha Ganatra as Reena
 Jill Hennessy as Lisa
 Sakina Jaffrey as Sarita
 Madhur Jaffrey as Meenu
 Nick Chinlund as Mitch
 Cara Buono as Janis
 Ajay Naidu as Raju
 Daniella Rich as Tiffany

Critical reception
On Rotten Tomatoes the film has an approval rating of 83% based on 19 reviews. On Metacritic the film has a score of 66 out of 100 based on reviews from 8 critics.

Awards 
Chutney Popcorn won several film festival awards between 1999 and 2001 including at the San Francisco International Lesbian & Gay Film Festival, the Paris Lesbian Film Festival and L.A. Outfest. It was nominated for a GLAAD Media Award for Outstanding TV Movie in 2001.

See also 
 List of LGBT-related films directed by women

References

External links 
 Official site
 
 

1999 comedy-drama films
1999 films
1999 LGBT-related films
American comedy-drama films
Asian-American LGBT-related films
1990s English-language films
Films directed by Nisha Ganatra
Indian independent films
Films about Indian Americans
Lesbian-related films
American pregnancy films
LGBT-related comedy-drama films
1990s American films